MV Nimpkish is an  formerly owned by BC Ferries. Nimpkish entered service with the Ministry of Transportation's Salt Water division in 1973, and was built in Vancouver to serve the inter-island routes. The vessel was transferred to BC Ferries in 1985. It formerly did runs on the Discovery Coast Connector service, a summer-only route linking Port Hardy, Bella Bella, Shearwater, Klemtu, Ocean Falls and Bella Coola.

Passenger amenities on-board are sparse, with only seating and a washroom available.

It was Auctioned by BC ferries in 2019 and bought by Mike Buttle Services. It currently runs by the name the "Mid Coaster" and has joined Mike's other former BC ferry "The Buttle Shuttle" (formerly the mill bay ferry) as part of his fleet.  The Buttle shuttle was converted to working ship caple of beach landing heavy equipment equipment and outfitted with a heavy crane for dock maintenance and installation , The Mid Coaster however is currently undergoing retro fit to become a pleasure vessel. Complete with a fully gally, state rooms, helipad, and the ability to beach land and unload recreational vehicles.

The former has been retired and the latter is on a bare deck lease in Prince Rupert. BC Ferries sold Nimpkish 2018. It was replaced on the Discovery Coast Connector service by the Northern Sea Wolf.

References

External links
 More about Nimpkish
 BC ferries website

N-class ferries
1973 ships
Ships built in British Columbia